Donovan Ebanks, MBE, JP, served as acting Governor of the Cayman Islands in 2009 and 2010. He also held the title of "Chief Secretary & Head of the Civil Service". At present, he is Chairman of Civil Service Appeals Commission, as well as the Records Management Advisory Committee. He was the Cayman Islands' first Deputy Governor. He was the Cayman Islands' most senior civil servant at the time of his retirement in 2012. His father is Craddock Ebanks.

References

Living people
Governors of the Cayman Islands
Year of birth missing (living people)
Place of birth missing (living people)
Members of the Order of the British Empire
Justices of the peace